In mathematics and theoretical physics, and especially gauge theory, the deformed Hermitian Yang–Mills (dHYM) equation is a differential equation describing the equations of motion for a D-brane in the B-model (commonly called a B-brane) of string theory. The equation was derived by Mariño-Minasian-Moore-Strominger in the case of Abelian gauge group (the unitary group ), and by Leung–Yau–Zaslow using mirror symmetry from the corresponding equations of motion for D-branes in the A-model of string theory.

Definition 

In this section we present the dHYM equation as explained in the mathematical literature by Collins-Xie-Yau. The deformed Hermitian–Yang–Mills equation is a fully non-linear partial differential equation for a Hermitian metric on a line bundle over a compact Kähler manifold, or more generally for a real -form. The case of a line bundle consists of setting  where  is the first Chern class of a holomorphic line bundle . Suppose that  and consider the topological constant

Suppose that . Then this is a complex number

for some real  and angle  which is uniquely determined.

Fix a smooth representative differential form  in the class . For a smooth function  write , and notice that .

The second condition should be seen as a positivity condition on solutions to the first equation. That is, one looks for solutions to the equation  such that . This is in analogy to the related problem of finding Kähler-Einstein metrics by looking for metrics  solving the Einstein equation, subject to the condition that  is a Kähler potential (which is a positivity condition on the form ).

Discussion

Relation to Hermitian Yang–Mills equation 

The dHYM equations can be transformed in several ways to illuminate several key properties of the equations. First, simple algebraic manipulation shows that the dHYM equation may be equivalently written

In this form, it is possible to see the relation between the dHYM equation and the regular Hermitian Yang–Mills equation. In particular, the dHYM equation should look like the regular HYM equation in the so-called large volume limit. In fact, and we can expand

Here we see that 

and we see the dHYM equation for  takes the form

Thus we see the leading order term in the dHYM equation is

which is just the HYM equation (replacing  by  if necessary).

Local form 

The dHYM equation may also be written in local coordinates. Fix  and holomorphic coordinates  such that at the point , we have

Here  for all  as we assumed  was a real form. Define the Lagrangian phase operator to be

Then simple computation shows that the dHYM equation in these local coordinates takes the form

where . In this form one sees that the dHYM equation is fully non-linear and elliptic.

Solutions 

It is possible to use algebraic geometry to study the existence of solutions to the dHYM equation, as demonstrated by the work of Collins–Jacob–Yau and Collins–Yau. Suppose that  is any analytic subvariety of dimension . Define the central charge  by

In the specific example where , the blow-up of complex projective space, Jacob-Sheu show that  admits a solution to the dHYM equation if and only if  and for any , we similarly have

It has been shown by Gao Chen that in the so-called supercritical phase, where , algebraic conditions analogous to those above imply the existence of a solution to the dHYM equation. This is achieved through comparisons between the dHYM and the so-called J-equation in Kähler geometry.

In general it is conjectured that the existence of solutions to the dHYM equation for a class  should be equivalent to the Bridgeland stability of the line bundle . This is motivated both from comparisons with similar theorems in the non-deformed case, such as the famous Kobayashi–Hitchin correspondence which asserts that solutions exist to the HYM equations if and only if the underlying bundle is slope stable. It is also motivated by physical reasoning coming from string theory, which predicts that physically realistic B-branes (those admitting solutions to the dHYM equation for example) should correspond to Π-stability.

Relation to string theory 

Superstring theory predicts that spacetime is 10-dimensional, consisting of a Lorentzian manifold of dimension 4 (usually assumed to be Minkowski space or De sitter or anti-De Sitter space) along with a Calabi–Yau manifold  of dimension 6 (which therefore has complex dimension 3). In this string theory open strings must satisfy Dirichlet boundary conditions on their endpoints. These conditions require that the end points of the string lie on so-called D-branes (D for Dirichlet), and there is much mathematical interest in describing these branes. 

In the B-model of topological string theory, homological mirror symmetry suggests D-branes should be viewed as elements of the derived category of coherent sheaves on the Calabi–Yau 3-fold . This characterisation is abstract, and the case of primary importance, at least for the purpose of phrasing the dHYM equation, is when a B-brane consists of a holomorphic submanifold  and a holomorphic vector bundle  over it (here  would be viewed as the support of the coherent sheaf  over ), possibly with a compatible Chern connection on the bundle.

Mathematically the B-field is a gerbe or bundle gerbe over spacetime, which means  consists of a collection of two-forms  for an open cover  of spacetime, but these forms may not agree on overlaps, where they must satisfy cocycle conditions in analogy with the transition functions of line bundles (0-gerbes).

The dHYM equation describes the equations of motion for this D-brane  in spacetime equipped with a B-field , and is derived from the corresponding equations of motion for A-branes through mirror symmetry. In the above section the dHYM equation has been phrased for the D6-brane .

See also
 Hermitian Yang–Mills connection
 Yang–Mills connection
 Thomas–Yau conjecture

References

Geometry
String theory
Differential geometry
Partial differential equations